Niamh Walsh (born April 17, 1988) is an Irish actress.

Career
She is best known for her role as Cara Martinez the in BBC One medical drama Holby City. Walsh also appeared in Casualty and Jekyll and Hyde. She starred in the Sky 1 period drama Jamestown as Verity Rutter née Bridges. Before production, Walsh stated that she "researched a lot for this role. I love all that stuff. Bill [Gallagher] used real people as the basis for some of his characters. And by reading books about the period you learn little things that even if the audience doesn’t see it, it adds to your performance."

In 2021, Walsh appeared alongside Dervla Kirwan, Seána Kerslake and Gemma-Leah Devereux in the RTÉ One thriller drama series Smother, in which she portrayed Jenny, the eldest Ahern sibling. In an article with the Irish Independent, Walsh shared her interest in portraying one of the powerful and independent woman in the series, as stated:

On 26 May 2021, Walsh was cast in the Netflix adaptation of DC Comics's The Sandman, portraying the young Ethel Cripps.

Filmography

Television

Audio

Stage

References

External links 
 

21st-century Irish actresses
Alumni of the London Academy of Music and Dramatic Art
Irish expatriates in the United Kingdom
Irish television actresses
Living people
1988 births